Saint-Zotique is a municipality located within the Vaudreuil-Soulanges Regional County Municipality in the Montérégie region located about 45 minutes west of Montreal, Quebec, Canada. It is named for Saint Zoticus of Comana.

The municipality resides on the north shore of the St. Lawrence River and Lake Saint Francis and along the Quebec City–Windsor Corridor, the most populated area in Canada.

History
The first economic activities in the region started in the mid-18th century with forest exploitation and agriculture. The place was first named "Concession-du-Lac" and "Lac-Saint-François" after the adjacent lake. Subsequently, it was also known as "Longueuil-sur-le-Lac" (because it was part of the seigneury of New Longueuil, and "Moulin-Biron" (named after the owner of the first sawmill built near the wharf).

Saint-Zotique officially became parish near 1849 when it was separated from the parish of Saint-Polycarpe located a few kilometres to the north. In 1854, its post office opened, and a year later in 1855, the Parish Municipality of Saint-Zotique was formed.

In 1913, the village itself split off from the parish municipality to form the Village Municipality of Saint-Zotique, and eventually the two municipalities merged again to form a new village municipality in 1967. On 4 April 2009, it changed its status to just municipality.

Demographics

Language

Attractions

The town is home to a popular beach which can accommodate as many as 10,000 people. Located on Lac Saint-François, nautical sports are among the region's most popular activities and the town also has a golf course.

Local government

Saint-Zotique forms part of the federal electoral district of Salaberry—Suroît and has been represented by Claude DeBellefeuille of the Bloc Québécois since 2019. Provincially, Saint-Zotique is part of the Soulanges electoral district and is represented by Marilyne Picard of the Coalition Avenir Québec since 2018.

List of former mayors:

 Firmin François Liénard (1913–1915)
 Joseph Arsène Adolphe Bray (1916, 1931–1933)
 Joseph Omer Alphonse Méthot (1916–1917)
 Henri-Pie-Marie-Joseph-Alfred La Rocque (1917–1921)
 Jean Baptiste Sauvé (1921–1925)
 Josephat Léger (1925–1929)
 Hilaire Duval (1929–1931, 1933–1935)
 Joseph François d'Assise Adrien Cadieux (1935)
 Joseph Joachim Eugène Bissonnette (1935)
 Pierre Montpetit (1935)
 Albert Rochon (1935–1939)
 Joseph Tancrède Asselin (1939–1942)
 Cyrille Joseph Albert Richer Laflèche (1942, 1944)
 Louis Julien Bergevin (1942–1944)
 Joseph-Wilfrid-Godefroi Blanchard (1944–1971)
 Joseph Alfred Jacques Claude Blanchard (1971–1985)
 Joseph-Wilfrid-Maurice-Yvon Leroux (1985–1998)
 Robert Hovington (1998–2005)
 Gaëtane Legault (2005–2013)
 Yvon Chiasson (2013–present)

Infrastructure

Transportation
Located on Route 338 and just south of Autoroute 20 near the Ontario-Quebec border, it is easily accessible from the busiest transportation corridor of the country with direct links to Montreal, Cornwall and Toronto.

Education
Commission Scolaire des Trois-Lacs operates Francophone schools.
 École de la Riveraine
 École des Orioles
 École Saint-Zotique
 École Virginie-Roy
 2e Avenue is zoned to École Léopold-Carrière in Les Coteaux

Lester B. Pearson School Board operates Anglophone schools.
 Soulanges Elementary School in Saint-Télesphore or Evergreen Elementary and Forest Hill Elementary (Junior Campus and Senior campus) in Saint-Lazare

See also
 List of municipalities in Quebec

References

External links

 Website of Saint-Zotique, Quebec 
 Municipal Beach Website 
 Map of the Vaudreuil-Soulanges region

Municipalities in Quebec
Incorporated places in Vaudreuil-Soulanges Regional County Municipality
Quebec populated places on the Saint Lawrence River
Greater Montreal